Franco Mondini-Ruiz (born 1961) is an American artist who lives and works in San Antonio, Texas and New York, New York. He is of Mexican and Italian descent. According to art critic Roberta Smith, his work "questions notions of preciousness and art-market exclusivity while delivering a fizzy visual pleasure". Mondini-Ruiz takes a variety of approaches to creating art, working in  installation, performance, painting, sculpture, and short stories.

He was a 2004 Artist-in-Residence at the McColl Center for Visual Art in Charlotte, NC.

Infinito Botanica
One of Mondini-Ruiz's earliest major projects was his "Infinito Botanica," an installation that references the Mexican botánicas common in his hometown of San Antonio, Texas. In the mid-90s Mondini-Ruiz purchased a botánica on South Flores street in San Antonio that had been in operation since the 1930s. He used this space to create a hybrid installation / store, which he considered "part of a social and figurative sculpture that mixed traditional botánica fare with his own sculpture and installations, as well as with the contemporary work of local cutting-edge and outsider artists, locally made craft, folk art, cultural artifacts and junk." Mondini-Ruiz has created different site-specific versions of this project at the Center for Curatorial Studies at Bard College (1999), the Whitney Biennial (2000), and the Kemper Art Museum in St Louis (2001).

Piñatas
Mondini-Ruiz has also created a series of piñata versions of famous works of modern and contemporary art. These piñatas have been exhibited at the Aljira, A Center for Contemporary Art in collaboration with the Newark Museum. The exhibition, titled "Mexican Museum of Modern Art" included piñata versions of works by Donald Judd, Piet Mondrian, Andy Warhol, Jeff Koons, and many other modern and contemporary artists. A version of this series was also shown at Artpace in San Antonio, this time under the title "Modern Piñatas".

High Pink
In 2005, Distributed Art Publishers published Franco Mondini-Ruiz's book "High Pink: Tex-Mex Fairy Tales." The book includes short stories from South Texas and photographs of Mondini-Ruiz's artwork.

References

Further reading
Review of Quattrocento by Roberta Smith in New York Times 
 Edward Leffingwell, Review of Quattrocento, Art in America
Review of 2000 Whitney Biennial by Katy Seigel in Art Forum
Review of Que Purdy by Catherine D. Anspon in Art Lies
Interview by Cary Cordova for Smithsonian Archives
Art at Our Doorstep: San Antonio Writers and Artists featuring Franco Mondini-Ruiz. Edited by Nan Cuba and Riley Robinson (Trinity University Press, 2008).

External links
Franco Mondini-Ruiz official website

20th-century American painters
American male painters
21st-century American painters
American artists of Mexican descent
Living people
1961 births
St. Mary's University, Texas alumni
People from San Antonio
Painters from New York City
American people of Italian descent
20th-century American sculptors
20th-century American male artists
American male sculptors
Sculptors from New York (state)